Richard Edes (or Eedes) (1555–1604) was an English churchman. He became Dean of Worcester, and was nominated one of the translators for the Authorised King James Version, in the Second Oxford Company, but died in the earliest stages of the project.

Life

He was born probably in Bedfordshire, was educated at Westminster School, and was elected student of Christ Church, Oxford in 1571. There he proceeded B.A. 17 December 1574, and M.A. 2 May 1578. Taking orders he was a noted preacher. He was elected university proctor 10 April 1583, proceeded B.D. 6 July 1584, and D.D. 6 July 1590.

In favour at court, he had rapid preferment, with prebends at Salisbury (1584), Christ Church (1586), and Hereford (1590). He was made treasurer of Hereford Cathedral and chaplain to the Queen in 1596.  On 19 June 1597 he became Dean of Worcester. He was presented to the rectory of Upton-upon-Severn, Worcestershire, 21 December 1598.

King James I, whose chaplain he became, appointed him one of the 54 translators who were to create the King James Version of the Bible. He was one of those divines who assembled at Oxford; but he did not live to see the undertaking, dying at Worcester 19 November 1604. He was buried in the chapel at the east end of the cathedral choir. His widow, Margaret, a daughter of Herbert Westfaling, Bishop of Hereford, erected a monument with a punning epitaph.

Works
He was the reputed author of Julius Caesar (Caesar Interfectus), a Latin tragedy acted at Christ Church in 1582, which has been lost apart from a possible epilogue. A journey north with his friend Toby Mathew prompted Latin verse, entitled Iter Boreale. Edes also left various other Latin and English poems, scattered through several manuscript collections of the poetry of his day, and William Gager addressed verse to him. Of his published works Anthony Wood mentions 'Six Learned and Godly Sermons,' London, 1604, and 'Three Sermons,' London, 1627.

References

1544 births
1604 deaths
Deans of Worcester
English Renaissance dramatists
Translators of the King James Version
16th-century English writers
16th-century male writers
People from Bedfordshire
People educated at Westminster School, London
Alumni of Christ Church, Oxford
16th-century English Anglican priests
16th-century English dramatists and playwrights
17th-century Anglican theologians
16th-century Anglican theologians